The United States Immigration Station is a government building located at 333 Mount Elliott Street in Detroit, Michigan. It is currently known as the Rosa Parks Federal Building, and houses the Detroit Field Office of Immigration and Customs Enforcement. It was listed on the National Register of Historic Places in 2013.

History
In 1853, a section of land on the corner of Mt Elliott and Jefferson Avenues in Detroit was set aside for the purpose of constructing a Marine Hospital. The original hospital was completed in 1857, and sited 225 feet off Jefferson. The hospital opened the same year, with Zina Pitcher as the first physician in charge.

At some point, additional structures were built to support the hospital, including a building to house nurses on the corner of Mount Elliott and Jefferson. The hospital was eventually moved to a new building farther east, and the Detroit Border Patrol Station was installed in the nurse's quarters. A modern addition was constructed in the rear of the building in 1964. The building was designated the "Rosa Parks Federal Building" in 2005.

In 2014, the building received extensive interior renovations and updates.

See also
United States Immigration Station, Angel Island.

References

National Register of Historic Places in Detroit
Immigration to the United States
U.S. Immigration and Customs Enforcement
United States Marine Hospitals
Hospital buildings on the National Register of Historic Places in Michigan